Matej Šnofl (born 21 February 1977 in SFR Yugoslavia) is a retired football defender.

During his club career, Šnofl played for Maribor, Dravograd, Gorica, Olimpija Ljubljana, Koper and Celje. He also made 7 appearances for the Slovenia national team.

See also
List of NK Maribor players

External links

1977 births
Living people
Slovenian footballers
Association football defenders
NK Maribor players
NK Železničar Maribor players
Slovenian PrvaLiga players
ND Gorica players
NK Olimpija Ljubljana (1945–2005) players
FC Koper players
NK Celje players
Slovenia international footballers